Eating Raoul is a musical with music by Jed Feuer, lyrics by Boyd Graham, and a book by Paul Bartel and Richard Blackburn. It is based on the 1982 movie of the same name.

The story focuses on Mary and Paul Bland, a couple of "squares", in the late 1960s, who want to raise money to open a restaurant. They decide to kill swingers for profit by hitting them on the head with a frying pan. They become involved with a partner, Raoul, their swarthy, sexy janitor, who helps them to dispose of the bodies. However, they soon feel trapped by Raoul and dispatch him too; he becomes the main course.

The musical opened Off-Broadway at the Union Square Theatre on May 13, 1992, starring Courtenay Collins, Eddie Korbich and Adrian Zmed.  It was directed by Toni Kotite and choreographed by Lynne Taylor-Corbett. Since then it has received numerous regional productions.

Roles and original cast
Paul Bland – Eddie Korbich
Mary Bland – Courtenay Collins
Raoul Mendoza – Adrian Zmed
Dr. Doberman; Ginger – M. W. Reid
Inez; Cop – Lovette George
Donna the Dominatrix; Yolanda – Cindy Benson
Mr. Leech; Howard; Bobby – David Masenheimer
Mr. Kray; James; Junior – Jonathan Brody
Gladys – Susan Wood

Musical numbers
Meet the Blands
A Small Restaurant
La La Land
Swing, Swing, Swing
Happy Birthday Harry
You Gotta Take Pains
A Thought Occurs
Victim Update
Sexperts
Basketball
Empty Bed
Tool For You
Think About Tomorrow
Eating Raoul
Momma Said
Lovers In Love
Mary
Hot Monkey Love
One Last Bop
Finale

References
Eating Raoul at the Musical Heaven website.

External links
Script to Eating Raoul
Review in The New York Times

1992 musicals
Cannibalism in fiction
Off-Broadway musicals
Musicals based on films